CBS 2 may refer to:

Airports
Estevan (Blue Sky) Aerodrome near Estevan, Saskatchewan, Canada

Television stations in the United States

Owned-and-Operated
KCBS-TV, Los Angeles, California
KDKA-TV, Pittsburgh, Pennsylvania
WBBM-TV, Chicago, Illinois
WCBS-TV, New York City, New York

Currently affiliated
KALB-TV-DT2 in Alexandria, Louisiana (cable channel; broadcasts on channel 5.2)
KBOI-TV in Boise, Idaho
KGAN in Cedar Rapids, Iowa 
KPSP-CD in Palm Springs, California (cable channel; broadcasts on channel 38)
KREM in Spokane, Washington
KTVQ in Billings, Montana
KTVN in Reno, Nevada
KUTV in Salt Lake City, Utah
KXMA-DT2 in Dickinson, North Dakota
Part of the KX Television Network
WFMY-TV in Greensboro, North Carolina
WKTV-DT2 in Utica, New York

Formerly affiliated
KFEQ-TV (now KQTV) in St. Joseph, Missouri (1953 to 1967)
KTWO-TV in Casper, Wyoming (1957 to 1980)
TV2 (cable only) in U.S. Virgin Islands (2009 to 2018)
WBAY-TV in Green Bay, Wisconsin (1953 to 1992)
WJBK in Detroit, Michigan (1948 to 1994)
WKAQ-TV in San Juan, Puerto Rico (1954 to 1967)
WMAR-TV in Baltimore, Maryland (1948 to 1981)
WTWO/WLBZ-TV in Bangor, Maine (1955 to 1959)